"Yester Love" (Tamla 54167) was a 1968 song by Motown Records R&B group The Miracles (aka "Smokey Robinson" and The Miracles) on its Tamla subsidiary label. It was recorded on December 18, 1967 (released on May 13, 1968), and was included on the group's album, Special Occasion.

Composed by Miracles lead singer Smokey Robinson, and Motown staff songwriter Al Cleveland and produced by Robinson, the song was a Billboard top 40 pop hit, peaking at No. 31, and a top 10 R&B hit as well, peaking at No. 9. It also reached No. 24 on the U.S. Cash Box Top 100.  In Canada, the song reached No. 28.

A mid-tempo song, instead of the usual ballad, a trademark of The Miracles, this tune is a sad lament about a lost love, the theme of many Miracles' songs. The song's title, "Yester Love", is a shortened form of "Yesterday Love", or "Love of Yesterday", indicating the relationship has now ended. Smokey, as the song's narrator, portrays a heartbroken man, reminiscing about a once-happy relationship with his girl, with promise of a future, that ended in failure, with his wondering just how it got there:

"Yesterday, we made future plans....
She loved me, I could tell...
Can today be that tomorrow...
That we planned so well...

Yester Baby, I'll never forget her...
Though tomorrow might bring me one better...
Today, I go my way, dreaming of my Yester love..."

During the song, Smokey, ever the master poet, also explains the meaning of his use of the term "Yester", in his usual fashion:

"Yester is.....
The Prefix that we fix
To things that have gone by...
Forever, they say...."
 
Miracle Marv Tarplin's outstanding guitar work is evident throughout, and is actually the last thing the listener hears as the song draws to a close. During the song, Miracles Claudette Robinson, cousin Bobby Rogers, Ronnie White, and Pete Moore, project sympathetic background vocals to Smokey's lead, with Claudette's voice clearly audible in the chorus.

Cash Box called the song a "gem," stating that it is a "percolating rhythmic workout" with "tender blues vocals."

"Yester Love" was released during 1968, a period during which The Miracles, a normally guaranteed Top 20 and occasional Top 10 group, were undergoing an inexplicable chart decline, along with many of Motown's other top groups, including The Supremes. This trend was soon reversed by the Top 10 success of their hit "Baby, Baby Don't Cry" in spring 1969.

"Yester Love" has inspired a cover version by Gerald Wilson and his Orchestra, and has been included in several Miracles "Greatest Hits" anthologies. Taken from the same album, the song's "B" side, "Much Better Off", like many Miracles "B" sides, was also a popular regional hit, and inspired a cover version by late rapper J Dilla.

Personnel — The Miracles
 Smokey Robinson - lead vocals
 Pete Moore - bass vocals
 Claudette Rogers-Robinson - soprano vocals
 Ronnie White - baritone vocals
 Bobby Rogers - tenor vocals
 Marv Tarplin -guitar

Other personnel
 The Funk Brothers

Bibliography
Smokey Robinson & The Miracles: The 35th Anniversary Collection (The Miracles' Discography, p. 61)

References

External links
  
Review of "Yester Love"by The Miracles- from the "Old School Music Lover" website.

The Miracles songs
Songs written by Smokey Robinson
1968 singles
Tamla Records singles
Songs written by Al Cleveland
Song recordings produced by Smokey Robinson
1968 songs